Chinese  can refer to:
 Something related to China
 Chinese people, people identified with China, through nationality, citizenship, and/or ethnicity
Zhonghua minzu, the supra-ethnic concept of the Chinese nation
 List of ethnic groups in China, people of various ethnicities in contemporary China
 Han Chinese, East Asian ethnic group native to China.
 Ethnic minorities in China, people of non-Han Chinese ethnicities in modern China
 Ethnic groups in Chinese history, people of various ethnicities in historical China
 Nationals of the People's Republic of China
 Nationals of the Republic of China 
 Overseas Chinese, Chinese people residing outside the territories of Mainland China, Hong Kong, Macau, and Taiwan
 Sinitic languages, the major branch of the Sino-Tibetan language family
 Chinese language, a group of related languages spoken predominantly in China, sharing a written script (Chinese characters in traditional and simplified forms)
 Standard Chinese, the standard form of Mandarin Chinese in Mainland China, similar to forms of Mandarin Chinese in Taiwan and Singapore
 Varieties of Chinese, topolects grouped under Chinese languages
 Written Chinese, writing scripts used for Chinese languages
Chinese characters, logograms used for the writing of East Asian languages
 Chinese cuisine, styles of food originating from China or their derivatives
"Chinese", a song about take out meals by Lily Allen from It's Not Me, It's You

See also
 Chinese citizen (disambiguation)
 Tang Chinese (disambiguation)
 

Language and nationality disambiguation pages